Baroness Olga Vadimovna von Root (1901–1967) was a Russian stage actress and singer. Born into a noble family of German, Polish, and Greek background, von Root was educated at the Smolny Institute of Noble Maidens in Russia. As a teenager, she ran away from home and travelled with a Romani family, studying their music and dance. During the Russian Revolution, while her father served in the White Army, von Root performed in cabarets and nightclubs to help support her family. After the war, she performed in Russia and other European countries as a stage actress and singer under the stage name Olga Vadina. She later married American industrialist Armand Hammer and moved to the United States, taking up residence in Manhattan. While living in New York, she worked to transcribe numerous Romani ballads. Von Root is the grandmother of American businessman Michael Armand Hammer and the great-grandmother of American actor Armie Hammer.

Early life and family 
Baroness Olga Vadimovna von Root was born in Sevastopol, Crimea in 1901. She was the daughter of Baron Vadim Nicholaievitch von Root, a Czarist military officer and nobleman, and Lubov Karlovna Kostsyushko-Valyuzhinich, a member of a Polish landed gentry family. Von Root's paternal ancestors were Volga German nobles who came to Russia during the reign of Peter the Great to serve in the Imperial Russian Army. Her maternal grandfather, Karl Kazimirovich Kostsyushko-Valyuzhinich, was Catholic and the founder of the Archeological Museum in Chersonesos. Her maternal grandmother, Maria Pavlovna Revelioti, was a Russian Orthodox woman of Greek descent and the granddaughter of the landowner, Russian general, and Greek revolutionary Theodosius Revelioti. Through her mother, von Root was also a descendent of the Polish military leader Tadeusz Kościuszko.

Revolution and stage career 
Von Root was educated at the Smolny Institute of Noble Maidens in Saint Petersburg, where she trained as a singer. at the age of fifteen, she ran away and took up performing with a troop of Romani performers, learning their music and dances from Nikolai Kroutchine. She was later found and returned to her family.

During the October Revolution, von Root's family moved from Moscow to Kiev. Her father, loyal to Nicholas II of Russia, commanded troops in the White Army throughout the war. To support her family while her father was off fighting, von Root began singing in cabarets and night clubs. She was rounded up with other members of the White Movement by Bolsheviks during a raid, imprisoned, and was ordered to be executed. Her life was spared after a Bolshevik colonel, who recognized her from the stage, released her. The colonel later spared her mother and siblings from arrest during a raid on their home. The colonel informed von Root that her father would be granted amnesty if he defected from the White Army and joined the Red Army. She wrote to her father and persuaded him to change sides, after which he took a post as an instructor at the Soviety Military Academy.

During the rise of Communism, von Root became a star of the stage, as a singer and actress, performing under the name Olga Vadina. She was one of the top stars of post-Revolutionary Russia's concert theatre and had married her manager. She performed a program of Romani ballads at a theatre in Paris, later performing in other European capitals.

While living in New York City with her second husband, Armand Hammer, von Root worked with a musician to transcribe Russian and Romani music that she learned throughout her training.

Personal life 
In 1925, while performing in Yalta, von Root was introduced to the Jewish American millionaire industrialist Armand Hammer. The two fell in love and, after von Root obtained a divorce from her first husband in Moscow, she and Hammer were married in a civil ceremony in 1927. They had one son, Julian Armand Hammer, who was born in Moscow in 1928. Prior to her marriage to Hammer, von Root was given permission to leave Russia on multiple occasions to accompany him on business engagements between the Soviet Union and the United States. There was speculation during this time that she was agent of the Joint State Political Directorate.  The family left Moscow in 1930 and took up residence on Fifth Avenue in Manhattan. She and Hammer divorced in 1943.

Von Root was the grandmother of American businessman Michael Armand Hammer and the great-grandmother of American actor Armie Hammer.

References 

1901 births
20th-century Russian actresses
20th-century Russian women singers
20th-century Russian singers
Cabaret singers
Baltic German people from the Russian Empire
German baronesses
Nobility from the Russian Empire
Olga
People from Sevastopol
Russian people of Volga German descent
Russian people of German descent
Russian people of Greek descent
Russian people of Polish descent
Russian stage actresses
Soviet emigrants to the United States
White movement people
Date of birth missing
Year of death missing